Efrain Rintaro da Silva (エフライン・リンタロウ・ダ・シルバ, Efurain Rintarou Da Shiruba), commonly known as  is a Brazilian footballer who plays as a forward and currently play for J3 newly promoted club, FC Osaka.

Career
Rintaro began career in brazil, he joined a club team from the age of 7, and at the age of 14, he came to japan with his parents and older sister and began living in an apartment complex in Minato-ku, Nagoya. After that, his friend invited him to a soccer class hosted by the Nagoya International Center.

Rintaro joined Kashiwa Reysol in 2010 after graduating from Chukyo High School. In the 2011 season, he transferred to J2 League club, FC Gifu on a temporary basis and made his first appearance in the J. League in the 22nd minute of the second half of the match against Oita Trinita in the J2 League matchweek 36 on November 20th of the same year.  In the 2012 season, he transferred to JFL club, Blaublitz Akita on loan and participated in 27 games. After the end of the season, he left Kashiwa when his contract expired.

In 2013, he transferred to JFL club FC Ryukyu and participated in 19 games. He left after the season when his contract expired.

In April 2014, he transferred to Veertien Kuwana (now Veertien Mie renamed from 2015) in the first division of Mie Prefecture.

In 2015, he moved to Reinmeer Aomori. He scored two goals in the 2015 regional league finals, contributing to Aomori's victory and promotion to the JFL. He played 28 games in the 2016 JFL, but left the team after his contract expired at the end of the season.

Rintaro transferred to Suzuka Unlimited FC from 2017 (now Suzuka Point Getters renamed from 2020). In 2018, Rintaro contributed to the club's promotion to the JFL with 3 goals, the most in the 2018 Japanese Regional Champions League. In 2019, he scored 18 goals in the domestic league and won the JFL top scorer.

On 7 January 2022, Rintaro officially transfer to FC Osaka for 2022 season. On 20 November at same year, he brought his club promotion to the J3 League for the first time in history. On 11 December at same year, Rintaro has renewed contract with club and will continue to play for FC Osaka in the 2023 season.

Personal life
Rintaro was born in Curitiba, Brazil. He is third generation Japanese Brazilians whose maternal grandparents immigrated from Japan.

Career statistics

Club
.

Honours

 Individual
 JFL Top Scorer : 2019
 JFL Best XI : 2019

References

External links

J. League (#9)
Efrain Rintaro at FC Osaka

1991 births
Living people
Brazilian footballers
Brazilian expatriate footballers
Brazilian people of Japanese descent
Expatriate footballers in Japan
J2 League players
J3 League players
Japan Football League players
Kashiwa Reysol players
FC Gifu players
Blaublitz Akita players
FC Ryukyu players
Veertien Mie players
ReinMeer Aomori players
Suzuka Point Getters players
FC Osaka players
Association football forwards
Footballers from Curitiba